The 1942 Tipperary Senior Hurling Championship was the 52nd staging of the Tipperary Senior Hurling Championship since its establishment by the Tipperary County Board in 1887.

Boherlahan were the defending champions.

Thurles Sarsfields won the championship after an 8-05 to 0-01 defeat of Killenaule in the final. It was their 13th championship title overall and their first title since 1939.

References

Tipperary
Tipperary Senior Hurling Championship